Antonio Díaz may refer to:

People
 Antonio Díaz de Cardoso (16th century), Portuguese conquistador
 Antonio Díaz Soto y Gama (1880–1967), Mexican politician and revolutionary
 Antonio Diaz (Filipino politician) (1927–2011), politician in the House of Representatives of the Philippines
 Antonio Díaz-Miguel (1933–2000), Spanish basketball coach
 Antonio Díaz Sánchez (born 1962), Cuban dissident
 Antonio Díaz (footballer, born 1969) (1969–2013), Spanish footballer
 Antonio Díaz Gil (1934–2014), Spanish footballer
 Antonio Díaz (Chilean footballer) (born 2000), Chilean football forward for O'Higgins F.C.
 Antonio Díaz (boxer) (born 1976), Mexican boxer
 Antonio Díaz (karateka) (born 1980), Venezuelan karateka
 Antonio F. Díaz (1789–1869), Uruguayan general and politician

Places 
 Antonio Díaz Municipality, Delta Amacuro, a municipality in the Venezuelan state of Delta Amacuro

See also
 Antonio Dias (disambiguation)
 Antonio Fernando (born 1970), Spanish retired footballer born Antonio Fernando Díaz

Diaz, Antonio